Barrymore is a surname. Notable people with the surname include:

Barrymore family of American actors
Earl of Barrymore, a title in the Kingdom of Ireland dating to 1622

People with the surname Barrymore
Deborah Barrymore aka Deborah Moore (born 1963), English actress
Diana Barrymore (1921-1960), American actress
Drew Barrymore (born 1975), American actress and producer
Ethel Barrymore (1879–1959), American actress
John Barrymore (1882–1942), American actor
John Drew Barrymore (1932–2004), also known as John Barrymore Jr., actor
Lionel Barrymore (1878–1954), American actor
Maurice Barrymore (1849-1905), forefather of the Barrymore family of American actors
Michael Barrymore (born 1952), English comedian

Fictional people with the surname Barrymore
Mr. & Mrs. Barrymore, characters of the novel The Hound of the Baskervilles

See also 
 Barony of Barrymore, a barony in County Cork, Ireland
 Barrymore (play), a one-man show starring Christopher Plummer and written by William Luce
 Barrymore, a TV show hosted by Michael Barrymore
Barrymore's, a nightclub in Ottawa, Ontario